Meknès-Tafilalt (Arabic:  (Meknes-Tafilelt), Berber: Meknas-Tafilalt) was one of the sixteen former regions of Morocco that existed from 1997 to 2015. It was situated in north-central Morocco, bordering Algeria. It covered an area of 79,210 km² and record a population of 2,316,865 in the 2014 census. The capital was Meknes.

Administrative divisions
The region was subdivided into the following prefectures and provinces:

 Prefecture of Meknès (now part of the Fès-Meknès Region)
 El Hajeb Province (now part of the Fès-Meknès Region)
 Errachidia Province (now part of the Drâa-Tafilalet Region)
 Ifrane Province (now part of the Fès-Meknès Region)
 Khénifra Province (now part of the Béni Mellal-Khénifra Region)
 Midelt Province (now part of the Drâa-Tafilalet Region)

References

External links 

Former regions of Morocco